Churteh (also Romanized as Chūrteh; also known as Choorti, Chortī, and Chūrdeh) is a village in Jennat Rudbar Rural District, in the Central District of Ramsar County, Mazandaran Province, Iran. At the 2006 census, its population was 25, in 8 families.

References 

Populated places in Ramsar County